The Australian Racing Museum is a horse racing museum in Melbourne, Australia, dedicated to Thoroughbred horses, jockeys and trainers.
It was first set up at Caulfield Racecourse in 1981 and closed on 30 August 2003. It then moved to Federation Square on Flinders Street. In October 2010 the museum moved to the Australian Sports Museum (then National Sports Museum) at the MCG

References

External links
Official site

Museums in Melbourne
Horse racing museums and halls of fame
Sports museums in Australia
1981 establishments in Australia